Sky Map is an Android planetarium software application.

History 
Sky Map was designed and developed by a group of Google engineers in Pittsburgh, Pennsylvania as part of their 20% time.

It's now "donated and open-sourced".

Licensing 
On January 20, 2012, Google announced a student development partnership with Carnegie Mellon University and released Sky Map under the Apache 2.0 open source license.

Code 
The project is presently available in the form of a GitHub repository.

See also 
 Google Sky
 Planetarium software
 Stellarium
 Star chart - map of the night sky

References

External links 
 
 Sky Map at GitHub
 

Free and open-source Android software
Google
Planetarium technology
Free astronomy software